Geil or Geils may refer to:

 GeIL or Golden Emperor International Ltd., a Taiwanese manufacturer of computer components, founded 1993
 "Geil" (song), a 1986 disco song by Bruce and Bongo
 Geils, the name used by The J. Geils Band when recording their 1977 album Monkey Island

People with the surname 
 William Edgar Geil (1865–1925), American explorer, author, and photographer
 J. Geils (1946–2017), lead guitarist of the J. Geils Band
 Karl-Heinz Geils (born 1955), German footballer
Donna Geils Orender (born 1957), sports executive, former college and professional basketball player.

See also
 Giel (disambiguation)